Table tennis at the 1995 Southeast Asian Games is being held in the Gymnasium 2, Chiang Mai University in Chiang Mai, Thailand from 10 to 15 December 1995.

Medalists

Medal table

References

External links
 

1995
Southeast Asian Games
Table tennis competitions in Thailand
1995 Southeast Asian Games events
Chiang Mai